The right to housing (occasionally right to shelter) is the economic, social and cultural right to adequate housing and shelter. It is recognized in some national constitutions and in the Universal Declaration of Human Rights and International Covenant on Economic, Social and Cultural Rights. The right to housing is regarded as a freestanding right in the International human rights law which was clearly in the 1991 General Comment on Adequate Housing by the UN Committee on Economic, Social and Cultural Rights. The aspect of the right to housing under ICESCR include: availability of services, infrastructure, material and facilities; legal security of tenure; habitability; accessibility; affordability; location and cultural adequacy.

The UN Human Settlement Programme which promotes the right to housing in cooperation with the Office of the High Commissioner for Human Right is a reaffirmation of the 1996 Istanbul agreement and Habitat Agenda. It is known as UN-HABITAT, which is tasked with promoting housing rights through monitoring systems and awareness campaigns.

The section 26, chapter Two of the South African constitution establishes that ''everyone has the right to have access to adequate housing'' and it is the task of the Department of Human Settlement to implement this mandate. In United States, most states do not grant the right to shelter except in Massachusetts where just families have right to shelter. The 1999 constitution of Nigeria recognized the right to housing specifically in the section 43 which states: ''every citizen of Nigeria shall have the right to acquire and own immovable property anywhere in Nigeria''.

Definition 

The right to housing is recognized in a number of international human rights instruments. Article 25 of the Universal Declaration of Human Rights recognizes the right to housing as part of the right to an adequate standard of living.

It states that;

Article 11(1) of the International Covenant on Economic, Social and Cultural Rights (ICESCR) also guarantees the right to housing as part of the right to an adequate standard of living.

In international human rights law the right to housing is regarded as a freestanding right. This was clarified in the 1991 General Comment no 4 on Adequate Housing by the UN Committee on Economic, Social and Cultural Rights. The general comment provides an authoritative interpretation of the right to housing in legal terms under international law.

The Yogyakarta Principles on the application of international human rights law in relation to sexual orientation and gender identity affirm that:Everyone has the right to adequate housing, including protection from eviction, without discrimination and that States shall a) take all necessary legislative, administrative and other measures to ensure security of tenure and access to affordable, habitable, accessible, culturally appropriate and safe housing, not including shelters and other emergency accommodation, without discrimination on the basis of sexual orientation, gender identity or material or family status; b) take all necessary legislative, administrative and other measures to prohibit the execution of evictions that are not in conformity with their international human rights obligations, and ensure that adequate and effective legal or other appropriate remedies are available to any person claiming that a right to protection against forced evictions has been violated or is under threat of violation, including the right to resettlement, which includes the right to alternative land of better or equal quality and to adequate housing, without discrimination.The right to housing is also enshrined in Article 28 of the Convention on the Rights of Persons with Disabilities, Article 16 of the European Social Charter (Article 31 of the Revised European Social charter) and in the African Charter on Human and Peoples' Rights. According to UN Committee on Economic, Social and Cultural Rights, aspects of right to housing under ICESCR include: legal security of tenure; availability of services, materials, facilities and infrastructure; affordability; habitability; accessibility; location and cultural adequacy. As a political goal, right to housing was declared in F. D. Roosevelt's 1944 speech on the Second Bill of Rights.

UN Habitat 

The right to adequate housing was a key issue at the 1996 Habitat meeting in Istanbul and a main theme in the Istanbul Agreement and Habitat Agenda. Paragraph 61 of the agenda identifies the steps required by governments to "promote, protect and ensure the full and progressive realisation of the right to adequate housing". The 2001 Habitat meeting, known as Istanbul +5, reaffirmed the 1996 Istanbul Agreement and Habitat Agenda and established the UN Human Settlement Programme to promote the right to housing in cooperation with the Office of the High Commissioner for Human Rights. Known as UN–HABITAT, the programme is the most important international forum for the right to housing. It is tasked with promoting housing rights, through awareness campaigns, and to develop benchmarks and monitoring systems.

Implementations

South Africa 

One of the seven focus areas  by the South African human right is The Right to Adequate House and this is beyond the mere provision of building materials.

  The rights such as the right to public participation, equality, human dignity, and access to information are amongst the cross cutting rights linked with right to adequate housing as noted by the Constitutional Court in Government of the Republic of South Africa and Others v Grootboom and Others 2001 (1) SA 46 (CC)

In South Africa, section 26 of Chapter Two of the Constitution establishes that "everyone has the right to have access to adequate housing". The Department of Human Settlements is tasked with implementing this mandate. Based on recent data, around 3.6 million South Africans still live in shacks or informal settlements (2013 data), while it is estimated that around 200,000 are homeless or living on the streets (2015 data).

United States 

Most jurisdictions in the United States have no right to shelter. One exception is Massachusetts, where families (but not homeless individuals) do have the right to shelter. In California, runaway children have the right to be admitted to emergency shelters without parental consent.  New York City also recognizes a right to emergency shelter.

Nigeria

The right to housing is recognized in the 1999 constitution, specifically in section 43 which states that "every citizen of Nigeria shall have the right to acquire and own immovable property anywhere in Nigeria". It further stated in section 44 that ‘no movable property or any interest in immovable property shall be taken possession of compulsorily  and no right over or interest in any such property shall be acquired compulsorily in any part of Nigeria except in the manner and for purposes prescribed by law that, among  other  things:  requires   the   prompt   payment  of  compensation and ensures parties access to the court for the determination of his interest in the property and the amount of compensation payable". The provisions of Section 16(2)(d) of the constitution in the Fundamental Objectives and  Directive Principles of State  Policy, which states that "the state shall direct its policy towards ensuring that suitable and adequate shelter is provided for  all  citizens" implies the recognition of the need to provide shelter for citizens but such right excludes right to adequate housing. Additionally, Section  6(6)  (c)  of  the  constitution  declared  the  Fundamental Objectives  and  Directive  Principles  non-justiciable.

The housing conditions of people in Nigeria falls short of the international human rights law and standards, particularly vulnerable groups such as women, indigenous people, LGBTQ, internally displaced persons and people living with disability (PLW) in the rural settings of Abuja, Lagos and Port Harcourt. In 2014, WHO and UNICEF stated that 69% of the urban population of Nigeria were living in 'slums’ without basic amenities like potable water, sanitation services, electricity, garbage collection, and paved roads. Also, the 2013 Nigerian Demographic and Health Survey revealed that 57 million and 130 million Nigerians had no access to safe water and adequate sanitation respectively. According to the Federal Mortgage Bank of Nigeria, there was a deficit of 22 million housing units in 2019. The Lagos state government stated that the housing deficit in the state is at 2.5 million units, with 70 percent of its total population living in informal housing. There is a 20 percent yearly housing demand increase in Abuja, Ibadan and Kano. Generally, private market housing can only be affordable by a few. There is scarce rental housing which demand tenants to have advance rent of more than one year. Rent control or caps are not given attention in addition to landlord-tenant relations, with regulation laws poorly enforced.

See also 
 Civil Rights Act of 1968 – U.S. legislation which includes the Fair Housing Act
 Housing Benefit
 Housing estate
 Housing gap
 Public housing
 Section 8
 Subsidized housing

References

External links
 Special Rapporteur on adequate housing as a component of the right to an adequate standard of living, UN
 Report to UN HRC, 2008. A/HRC/7/16
 Report to UN HRC, 2009. A/HRC/13/20
 International standards of the right to housing
 Housing Rights Legislation: Review of International and National Legal Instruments
 CESCR General comments:
 The right to adequate housing (Art.11 (1)). CESCR General comment 4, 1991
 The right to adequate housing (Art.11.1): forced evictions. CESCR General comment 7, 1997
 Factsheet on right to housing, UN
 CoE Commissioner for Human Rights:
 Recommendation on the implementation of the right to housing, 2009
 Housing Rights: The Duty to Ensure Housing for All, 2008
 "No one should have to be homeless – adequate housing is a right", 2007
 Interpretation and application of Article 31 of RESC//Digest of the Case Law of the European Committee on Social Rights, 2008. pp. 169–173, 349—355
 Right to Housing Geneva: CETIM, 2007.

 
Housing
Human rights by issue
Housing rights activism